Nagornoye is a rural locality (a village) in Spasskoye Rural Settlement, Vologodsky District, Vologda Oblast, Russia. The population was 7 as of 2002. There are 6 streets.

Geography 
Nagornoye is located 15 km southwest of Vologda (the district's administrative centre) by road. Mozhayskoye is the nearest rural locality.

References 

Rural localities in Vologodsky District